Athletics competitions have been held at the Southeast Asian Games since the inaugural edition of the South East Asian Peninsular Games in 1959.

List of medalists

Men's 100 metres

Men's 200 metres

Men's 400 metres

Men's 800 metres

Men's 1500 metres

Men's 5000 metres

Men's 10,000 metres

Men's marathon

Men's 3000 metres steeplechase

Men's 110 metres hurdles

Men's 400 metres hurdles

Men's high jump
1959: 
1961: 
1965: 
1967: 
1969: 
1971: 
1973: 
1975: 
1977: 
1979: 
1981: 
1983: 
1985: 
1987: 
1989: 
1991: 
1993: 
1995: 
1997: 
1999: 
2001: 
2003: 
2005:

Men's pole vault
1959: 
1961: 
1965: 
1967: 
1969: 
1971: 
1973: 
1975: 
1977: 
1979: 
1981: 
1983: 
1985: 
1987: 
1989: 
1991: 
1993: 
1995: 
1997: 
1999: 
2001: 
2003: 
2005:

Men's long jump
1959: 
1961: 
1965: 
1967: 
1969: 
1971: 
1973: 
1975: 
1977: 
1979: 
1981: 
1983: 
1985: 
1987: 
1989: 
1991: 
1993: 
1995: 
1997: 
1999: 
2001: 
2003: 
2005:

Men's triple jump
1959: 
1961: 
1965: 
1967: 
1969: 
1971: 
1973: 
1975: 
1977: 
1979: 
1981: 
1983: 
1985: 
1987: 
1989: 
1991: 
1993: 
1995: 
1997: 
1999: 
2001: 
2003: 
2005:

Men's shot put
1959: 
1961: 
1965: 
1967: 
1969: 
1971: 
1973: 
1975: 
1977: 
1979: 
1981: 
1983: 
1985: 
1987: 
1989: 
1991: 
1993: 
1995: 
1997: 
1999: 
2001: 
2003: 
2005:

Men's discus throw
1959: 
1961: 
1965: 
1967: 
1969: 
1971: 
1973: 
1975: 
1977: 
1979: 
1981: 
1983: 
1985: 
1987: 
1989: 
1991: 
1993: 
1995: 
1997: 
1999: 
2001: 
2003: 
2005:

Men's hammer throw
1965: 
1967: 
1969: Not held
1971: 
1973: 
1975: 
1977: 
1979: 
1981: 
1983: 
1985: 
1987: 
1989: 
1991: 
1993: 
1995: ?
1997: 
1999: 
2001: 
2003: 
2005:

Men's javelin throw
1959: 
1961: 
1965: 
1967: 
1969: 
1971: 
1973: 
1975: 
1977: 
1979: 
1981: 
1983: 
1985: 
1987: 
1989: 
1991: 
1993: 
1995: 
1997: 
1999: 
2001: 
2003: 
2005:

Men's decathlon
1965: 
1967: 
1969: 
1971: 
1973: 
1975: 
1977: 
1979: 
1981: 
1983: 
1985: 
1987: 
1989: 
1991: 
1993: 
1995: 
1997: 
1999: 
2001: 
2003: 
2005:

Men's 10,000 metres walk
1977: 
1979: 
1981: 
1983: 
1985: 
1987: 
1989: 
1991: 
1993: 
1995:

Men's 20 kilometres walk
1971: 
1973: 
1975: 
1977: 
1979: 
1981: 
1983: 
1985: Not held
1987: 
1989: 
1991: 
1993: 
1995: ?
1997: 
1999: 
2001: 
2003: 
2005:

Men's 50 kilometres walk

Men's 4 × 100 metres relay

Men's 4 × 200 metres relay

Men's 4 × 400 metres relay

Women's 100 metres

Women's 200 metres
1959: 
1961: 
1965: 
1967: 
1969: 
1971: 
1973: 
1975: 
1977: 
1979: 
1981: 
1983: 
1985: 
1987: 
1989: 
1991: 
1993: 
1995: 
1997: 
1999: 
2001: 
2003: 
2005:

Women's 400 metres
1959: 
1961: 
1965: 
1967: 
1969: 
1971: 
1973: 
1975: 
1977: 
1979: 
1981: 
1983: 
1985: 
1987: 
1989: 
1991: 
1993: 
1995: 
1997: 
1999: 
2001: 
2003: 
2005:

Women's 800 metres
1965: 
1967: 
1969: 
1971: 
1973: 
1975: 
1977: 
1979: 
1981: 
1983: 
1985: 
1987: 
1989: 
1991: 
1993: 
1995: 
1997: 
1999: 
2001: 
2003: 
2005:

Women's 1500 metres
1971: 
1973: 
1975: 
1977: 
1979: 
1981: 
1983: 
1985: 
1987: 
1989: 
1991: 
1993: 
1995: 
1997: 
1999: 
2001: 
2003: 
2005:

Women's 3000 metres
1977: 
1979: 
1981: 
1983: 
1985: 
1987: 
1989: 
1991: 
1993: 
1995:

Women's 5000 metres
1987: 
1989: Not held
1991: Not held
1993: Not held
1995: Not held
1997: 
1999: 
2001: 
2003: 
2005:

Women's 10,000 metres
1987: 
1989: 
1991: 
1993: 
1995: 
1997: 
1999: 
2001: 
2003: 
2005:

Women's marathon
1983: 
1985: 
1987: 
1989: 
1991: 
1993: 
1995: 
1997: 
1999: Not held
2001: 
2003: 
2005:

Women's 3000 metres steeplechase

Women's 80 metres hurdles
1959: 
1961: 
1965: 
1967:

Women's 100 metres hurdles
1969: 
1971: 
1973: 
1975: 
1977: 
1979: 
1981: 
1983: 
1985: 
1987: 
1989: 
1991: 
1993: 
1995: 
1997: 
1999: 
2001: 
2003: 
2005:

Women's 200 metres hurdles
1971: 
1973: 
1975: 
1977:

Women's 400 metres hurdles
1977: 
1979: 
1981: 
1983: 
1985: 
1987: 
1989: 
1991: 
1993: 
1995: 
1997: 
1999: 
2001: 
2003: 
2005:

Women's high jump
1959: 
1961: 
1965: 
1967: 
1969: 
1971: 
1973: 
1975: 
1977: 
1979: 
1981: 
1983: 
1985: 
1987: 
1989: 
1991: 
1993: 
1995: 
1997: 
1999: 
2001: 
2003: 
2005:

Women's pole vault
2001: 
2003: 
2005:

Women's long jump

Women's triple jump
1995: 
1997: 
1999: 
2001: 
2003: 
2005:

Women's shot put
1959: 
1961: 
1965: 
1967: 
1969: 
1971: 
1973: 
1975: 
1977: 
1979: 
1981: 
1983: 
1985: 
1987: 
1989: 
1991: 
1993: 
1995: 
1997: 
1999: 
2001: 
2003: 
2005:

Women's discus throw
1959: 
1961: 
1965: 
1967: 
1969: 
1971: 
1973: 
1975: 
1977: 
1979: 
1981: 
1983: 
1985: 
1987: 
1989: 
1991: 
1993: 
1995: 
1997: 
1999: 
2001: 
2003: 
2005:

Women's hammer throw
2001: 
2003: 
2005:

Women's javelin throw
1959: 
1961: 
1965: 
1967: 
1969: 
1971: 
1973: 
1975: 
1977: 
1979: 
1981: 
1983: 
1985: 
1987: 
1989: 
1991: 
1993: 
1995: 
1997: 
1999: 
2001: 
2003: 
2005:

Women's pentathlon
1965: 
1967: 
1969: 
1971: 
1973: 
1975: 
1977: 
1979:

Women's heptathlon
1981: 
1983: 
1985: 
1987: 
1989: 
1991: 
1993: 
1995: ?
1997: 
1999: 
2001: 
2003: 
2005:

Women's 5000 metres walk
1977: 
1979: 
1981: 
1983: 
1985: 
1987: 
1989: 
1991: 
1993: 
1995:

Women's 10,000 metres walk
1977: 
1979: 
1981: 
1983: 
1985: Not held
1987: 
1989: 
1991: 
1993: 
1995: ?
1997: 
1999:

Women's 20 kilometres walk
2001: 
2003: 
2005:

Women's 4 × 100 metres relay
1959: 
1961: 
1965: 
1967: 
1969: 
1971: 
1973: 
1975: 
1977: 
1979: 
1981: 
1983: 
1985: 
1987: 
1989: 
1991: 
1993: 
1995: 
1997: 
1999: 
2001: 
2003: 
2005:

Women's 4 × 200 metres relay
1995:

Women's 4 × 400 metres relay
1971: 
1973: 
1975: 
1977: 
1979: 
1981: 
1983: 
1985: 
1987: 
1989: 
1991: 
1993: 
1995: 
1997: 
1999: 
2001: 
2003: 
2005:

References

Champions 1959–2006
South East Asian Games. GBR Athletics. Retrieved 2021-01-23.

Gold medalists
 List
Southeast Asian Games